Columbella rustica is a species of sea snail, a marine gastropod mollusk in the family Columbellidae, the dove snails.

Description

Distribution

Synonyms
 Colombella aureola Duclos, 1846
 Colombella reticulata Lamarck, 1822
 Colombella simpronia Duclos, 1846
 Colombella spongiarum Duclos, 1840
 Colombella striata Duclos, 1840 (dubious synonym)
 Colombella tumida Duclos, 1840
 Colombella vestalia Duclos, 1846
 Colombella zulmis Duclos, 1848
 Columbella ambigua Kiener, 1840
 Columbella barbadensis d'Orbigny, 1847
 Columbella fustigata Kiener, 1841
 Columbella gualtierana Risso, 1826
 Columbella guilfordia Risso, 1826 
 Columbella modesta Kiener, 1841
 Columbella procera Locard, 1886
 Columbella punctulata Risso, 1826
 Columbella rustica var. apiculata Pallary, 1900
 Columbella rustica var. cuneatiformis Pallary, 1900
 Columbella rustica var. elongata Philippi, 1836
 Columbella rustica var. lactea Monterosato, 1875
 Columbella rustica var. lutea Pallary, 1900
 Columbella rustica var. major Pallary, 1900
 Columbella rustica var. marmorata Monterosato, 1878
 Columbella rustica var. minima Bucquoy, Dautzenberg & Dollfus, 1882
 Columbella rustica var. minor Pallary, 1900
 Columbella rustica var. obesula Pallary, 1900
 Columbella rustica var. syriaca Coen, 1933
 Columbella rustica var. syriaca Monterosato, 1899
 Columbella rustica var. trigonostoma Pallary, 1920 
 Columbella striata Duclos, 1840
 Columbella striata Menke, 1829
 Pyrene rustica (Linnaeus, 1758)
 Voluta punctata T. Allan, 1818
 Voluta rustica Linnaeus, 1758 (original combination)
 Voluta tringa Linnaeus, 1758

References

 Gofas, S.; Le Renard, J.; Bouchet, P. (2001). Mollusca. in: Costello, M.J. et al. (eds), European Register of Marine Species: a check-list of the marine species in Europe and a bibliography of guides to their identification. Patrimoines Naturels. 50: 180-213

External links
 Linnaeus, C. (1758). Systema Naturae per regna tria naturae, secundum classes, ordines, genera, species, cum characteribus, differentiis, synonymis, locis. Editio decima, reformata [10th revised edition, vol. 1: 824 pp. Laurentius Salvius: Holmiae]
  Russini V., Fassio G., Modica M. V., deMaintenon M. J. & Oliverio M. (2017). An assessment of the genus Columbella Lamarck, 1799 (Gastropoda: Columbellidae) from eastern Atlantic. Zoosystema. 39(2): 197-212

Columbellidae
Gastropods described in 1758
Taxa named by Carl Linnaeus